was a Japanese science fiction writer and a researcher of Meiji era cultural history. He is the winner of multiple Taisho Awards, the Ozaki Memorial Prize, and the Mystery Writers of Japan Award.

Biography
Yokota was born 11 November 1945 in Saga Prefecture, Japan.

He became known for his knowledge of classic science fiction and his use of humor and gags in his writing. Together with Shingo Aizu, he wrote Kaidanji Oshikawa Shunrō: Nihon SF no Oya, the definitive work on Japanese science fiction author Shunrō Oshikawa. This work won the Nihon SF Taisho Award and nominated for a Seiun Award in 1988.

His 2011 work, won a Taisho Award, the Mystery Writers of Japan Award, and the Ozaki Hokki Memorial Popular Literature Research Prize. The Science Fiction and Fantasy Writers of Japan  awarded him the Special Services Award for lifetime achievements in the field of science fiction in 2018.

He died of heart failure on 4 January 2019 in Yokohama, Kanagawa Prefecture, Japan. A funeral was held for close relatives. His daughter, Masako Suzuki, lead the mourning, and an open memorial services was held afterward.

Selected works

Novels
 (January 1977, Hayakawa)
 (September 1977, Shūeisha)
 (June 1978, Hayakawa)
 (September 1978, Shūeisha)
 (December 1978, Kodansha)
 (June 1979, Kisotengaisha)
 (August 1979, Futabasha)
 (August 1980, Shūeisha)
 (May 1988, Shinchosha)
 (February 1991, Shinchosha)

Short story collections
 (January 1981, Tokuma Shoten)
 (March 1981, Shūeisha)
 (April 1981, Kadokawa Shoten)
 (May 1981, Futabasha)

Nonfiction
 (Yokota Jun'ya) (May 1977, Kōsaidō)
 (March 1980, Futabasha)
 (Yokota Jun'ya)
Volume 1 (May 1980, Hayakawa)
Volume 2 (December 1980, Hayakawa)
Volume 3 (April 1981, Hayakawa)
 (June 1980, Kodansha)
 (January 1982, Tokuma Shoten)
 (February 1982, Uraku Shuppansha)
 (November 1986, Kadokawa)
Kaidanji Oshikawa Shunrō: Nihon SF no Oya with Shingo Aizu (December 1987, Pan Research Institute)
 (January 2011, Pilar Press)
 (March 2012, Pilar Press)

Awards and honors
Yokota received the following awards and honors:

References

1945 births
2019 deaths
20th-century Japanese male writers
20th-century Japanese novelists
20th-century Japanese short story writers
21st-century Japanese novelists
21st-century Japanese short story writers
21st-century Japanese writers
21st-century Japanese historians
Japanese male short story writers
Japanese science fiction writers
Literary historians
Writers from Kanagawa Prefecture
Writers from Saga Prefecture